Romilda Baldacchino Zarb  (born 24 January 1981) is a Maltese politician, pharmacist and former television presenter who represents District 11 in the Parliament of Malta since her election in 2022. She previously served as the Mayor of Mosta from 2019 until her election to Parliament in 2022.

Early life and education
Romilda Baldacchino Zarb was born on 24 January, 1981, to Emanuel 'Emy' Zarb, a businessman from Mosta.

She studied pharmacy at the University of Malta, which she attended from 1998 until 2004.

Political career
Baldacchino Zarb first stood for election in the 2019 local council elections as a candidate with the Labour Party.

Television career
Romilda Baldacchino Zarb was a co-presenter on the ONE afternoon talk show Kalamita from 2018 until 2020.

Personal life
Baldacchino Zarb is mother to a son and a daughter.

See also 

 List of members of the parliament of Malta, 2022–2027
 List of mayors of places in Malta

References 

Living people
Members of the House of Representatives of Malta
21st-century Maltese women politicians
21st-century Maltese politicians
Women mayors of places in Malta
Labour Party (Malta) politicians
1981 births